Blackstreet is the debut studio album from American R&B group Blackstreet, released in 1994 on Interscope Records. The group was formed by Riley with Chauncey Hannibal after the dissolution of Teddy Riley's former group Guy. The other members of Blackstreet - Joseph Stonestreet and Levi Little - were session singers alongside Hannibal on Bobby Brown's third album Bobby, an album that was mostly produced by Riley. They recorded one song for the soundtrack of the Chris Rock film CB4 called "Baby Be Mine". Before they could record an album, Stonestreet left the group and was replaced by former Force One Network singer Dave Hollister. When they re-recorded "Baby Be Mine" for their self-titled debut, Hollister's vocals were added on the album version of the song.

Hip hop producer Erick Sermon co-produced the first single "Booti Call", which was a response to the rape trial and conviction of professional boxer Mike Tyson at the time of the album's release. Riley, who was a close friend of Tyson, referenced his incarceration in the album's liner notes: and to our main man Mike Tyson "we can't wait". The song's opening was done by stand up comedian Bill Bellamy, who popularized his infamous saying on an episode of Russell Simmons' Def Comedy Jam. The second single "Before I Let You Go" was released with a music video that featured appearances by actors Omar Epps and Shari Headley.

Also on the album is former member of The Sylvers songwriter and producer Leon Sylvers III, who collaborated with Riley on the writing and production of several songs on the album. Riley's proteges The Neptunes make one of their earliest appearances on Blackstreet as well, with Pharrell Williams and Chad Hugo receiving a co-writing and assistant producer credit on the song "Tonight's the Night", while Hugo plays the saxophone on the ballad "Happy Home".  Singer Michael Jackson helped with the composition of "Joy"- a song that was originally intended for Jackson's 1991 album Dangerous. Blackstreet would be the first and last album with members Hollister and Little, who left the group at the end of 1995.

The album peaked at number fifty-two on the Billboard 200 chart. By April 1995, it was certified platinum in sales by the RIAA, after sales exceeding 1,000,000 copies in the United States. Blackstreet's cover of the Stevie Wonder song "Love's in Need of Love Today" was featured in the 1995 Harrison Ford film Sabrina, but it does not appear on the film's soundtrack.

Release and reception

The album peaked at fifty-two on the U.S. Billboard 200 and reached the seventh spot on the R&B Albums chart. The album was certified platinum by April 1995.

While Stanton Swihart of Allmusic commented that some of the songs weren't fully formed and others sounded like new jack retreads, he did remark that the work included "some brilliantly catchy R&B tracks, songs that easily stood out in the mid-'90s urban soul crowd."

Track listing
 Songwriting and production credits adapted from liner notes.

Charts

Weekly charts

Year-end charts

Singles

"—" denotes releases that did not chart.

Personnel
Information taken from AllMusic.
assistant engineering – Serban Ghenea, George Mayers, Kimberly Smith, Sprague Williams
assistant executive production – Mike Concepcion, John McClain
associate production – Chad Hugo, "Lil" Chris Smith, Markell Riley, Leon F. Sylvers III, Thomas Taliaferro, Sprague Williams
design – Eric Altenburger
engineering – Serban Ghenea, John Hanes, George Mayers, Herb Powers, Kimberly Smith
guitar – Serban Ghenea, Thomas Taliaferro
mastering – Herb Powers
mixing – John Hanes, George Mayers, Teddy Riley
performing – Tammy Lucas
photography – Gerhard Yurkovic
production – Michael Barber, Markell Riley, Teddy Riley, Erick Sermon, "Lil" Chris Smith, Leon F. Sylvers III
project coordination – Dan O'Leary
rapping – Idris Davidson, Antwone Dickey, Markell Riley, Menton Smith, David Roland Williams
saxophone – Chad Hugo
stylist – Kareen Linton
vocal coach – Kenny Hicks
vocals – Chauncey Hannibal, Dave Hollister, Levi Little, Teddy Riley

References

External links
 
 Blackstreet at Discogs

1994 debut albums
Albums produced by Erick Sermon
Albums produced by Teddy Riley
Blackstreet albums
Interscope Records albums